Olavi Larkas (30 September 1913 – 6 May 1984) was a Finnish épée fencer  and modern pentathlete. He competed at the 1948 Summer Olympics.

References

1913 births
1984 deaths
Finnish male épée fencers
Finnish male modern pentathletes
Olympic fencers of Finland
Olympic modern pentathletes of Finland
Fencers at the 1948 Summer Olympics
Modern pentathletes at the 1948 Summer Olympics
Sportspeople from Helsinki